Alestes is a genus in the family Alestidae, known as the "African Characidae" as they are found exclusively on that continent. As suggested by that name, they Alestidae was formerly included in Characidae. Myletes is a synonym of Alestes, but the former name has historically also been used for various South American serrasalmines.

Within the Lake Chad basin, Alestes and Hydrocynus, collectively known as salanga, are lightly smoked and dried.

Species
There are currently seven recognized species in this genus:
 Alestes ansorgii Boulenger, 1910
 Alestes baremoze (Joannis, 1835) (Silversides)
 Alestes dentex (Linnaeus, 1758) (Characin)
 Alestes inferus Stiassny, Schelly & Mamonekene, 2009
 Alestes liebrechtsii Boulenger, 1898
 Alestes macrophthalmus Günther, 1867 (Torpedo robber)
 Alestes stuhlmannii Pfeffer, 1896
Species brought into synonymy
 Alestes bouboni Roman, 1973: synonym of Brycinus nurse (Rüppell, 1832)
 Alestes chaperi Sauvage, 1882: synonym of Brycinus longipinnis (Günther, 1864)
 Alestes longipinnis (Günther, 1864): synonym of Brycinus longipinnis (Günther, 1864)
 Alestes luteus Roman, 1966: synonym of Brycinus luteus (Roman, 1966)
 Alestes macrolepiditus (Valenciennes, 1850): synonym of Brycinus macrolepidotus Valenciennes, 1850
 Alestes macrolepidotus (Valenciennes, 1850): synonym of Brycinus macrolepidotus Valenciennes, 1850
 Alestes rutilus Boulenger, 1916: synonym of Brycinus macrolepidotus Valenciennes, 1850

References

External links
 on 2014-11-26 Bailly, N. (2014). Alestes. In: Froese, R. and D. Pauly. Editors. (2014) FishBase. Accessed through: World Register of Marine Species

 
Alestidae
Fish of Africa